Mirificarma aflavella is a moth of the family Gelechiidae. It is found in Greece (Rodhos), Turkey and Israel.

The wingspan is 7-9.5 mm for males and females. The head is moderately light golden-brown. The forewings have alternating transverse zig-zag patches of light golden-brown and mid-brown, weakly contrasting. Adults have been recorded from March to May.

References

Moths described in 1935
Mirificarma
Moths of Europe
Moths of Asia